Richard Smith (born in Detroit) is an American jazz guitarist. Smith teaches at University of Southern California's Thorton School of Music. 
He is currently engaged to soap actress Nancy Lee Grahn.

Solo albums
Rockin The Boat 1989
Puma Creek 1989
Bella Firenze 1991
From My Window 1994
First Kiss 1997
Flow 1999
Natural Soul 2002
SOuLIDIFIED 2003
LA Chillharmonic 2008
 Tangos 2014 - with Dutch/Colombian pianist, Tico Pierhagen, Brian Bromberg (bass) and Gene Coye (drums). A Chillharmonic Media release
• 'Let's Roll' (Single) 2021 - Sirius XM Watercolors - A Chillharmonic Media release
• 'Soul Share' (Single) w/Richard Elliot 2022 - Sirius XM Watercolors - A Chillharmonic Media release
• 'Groove Assets' (Single) 2022 - Sirius XM Watercolors - A Chillharmonic Media release

References

Living people
Year of birth missing (living people)
American jazz guitarists
USC Thornton School of Music faculty